Mayra Agustina Leiva Roux (born 17 August 1996) is an Argentine basketball player for Presidente Venceslau and the Argentina women's national basketball team.

She defended Argentina at the 2018 FIBA Women's Basketball World Cup.

References

External links

1996 births
Living people
Argentine expatriate basketball people in Brazil
Argentine women's basketball players
Centers (basketball)
Sportspeople from Mendoza, Argentina